Clyde Lensley McPhatter (November 15, 1932 – June 13, 1972) was an American rhythm and blues, soul, and rock and roll singer. He was one of the most widely imitated R&B singers of the 1950s and early 1960s and was a key figure in the shaping of doo-wop and R&B.

McPhatter's high-pitched tenor voice was steeped in the gospel music he sang in much of his early life. He was the lead tenor of the Mount Lebanon Singers, a gospel group he formed as a teenager. He was later the lead tenor of Billy Ward and his Dominoes and was largely responsible for the initial success of the group. After his tenure with the Dominoes, McPhatter formed his own group, the Drifters, and later worked as a solo performer. Only 39 at the time of his death, he struggled for years with alcoholism and depression, and was, according to Jay Warner's On This Day in Music History, "broke and despondent over a mismanaged career that made him a legend but hardly a success."

McPhatter left a legacy of over 22 years of recording history. He was the first artist to be inducted twice into the Rock and Roll Hall of Fame, first as a solo artist and later as a member of the Drifters.

Subsequent double and triple inductees into the Rock and Roll Hall of Fame are said to be members of the "Clyde McPhatter Club".

Life and career

Early life
McPhatter was born in the community of Hayti, in Durham, North Carolina on November 15, although the year is disputed. Some sources cite 1932. Author Colin Escott cites 1931, stating, "most biographies quote 1933 or 1934, although government documents cite the earlier year".  His grave marker cites his birth year as 1932.

He was raised in a Baptist family, the son of Rev. George McPhatter and his wife Beulah (some accounts refer to her as Eva). Starting at the age of five, he sang in his father's church gospel choir along with his three brothers and three sisters. When he was 10, Clyde was the soprano-voiced soloist for the choir.

In 1945, Rev. McPhatter moved his family to Teaneck, New Jersey, where Clyde attended Chelsior High School. He worked part-time as a grocery store clerk and was promoted to shift manager upon graduating high school. The family then relocated to New York City, where Clyde formed a gospel group, the Mount Lebanon Singers.

With Billy Ward and the Dominoes (1950–53)
In 1950, after winning the coveted Amateur Night at Harlem's Apollo Theater contest, McPhatter returned to his job as a store manager, but was later recruited by Billy Ward and his Dominoes and was present for the recording of "Sixty Minute Man" for Federal Records, produced by Ralph Bass.

Billy Ward and his Dominoes was one of the top R&B vocal groups in the country, garnering more popularity than the Clovers, the Ravens, and the Five Keys, largely due to McPhatter's fervent, high-pitched tenor. In his book The Drifters, Bill Millar named Ben E. King, Smokey Robinson of the Miracles, Sammy Turner, and Marv Johnson among the many vocalists who patterned themselves after McPhatter. "Most important," he concluded, "McPhatter took hold of the Ink Spots' simple major chord harmonies, drenched them in call-and-response patterns, and sang as if he were back in church. In doing so, he created a revolutionary musical style from which—thankfully—popular music will never recover."

After recording several more songs with the Dominoes, including "Have Mercy Baby", "Do Something for Me", and "The Bells", McPhatter left the Dominoes on May 7, 1953. He was sometimes passed off as "Clyde Ward, Billy's little brother". Others assumed  Billy Ward was doing the lead singing. As a member of the Dominoes, McPhatter did not earn much money; Ward paid him $100 a week, minus deductions for food, taxes, motel bills, etc. In an interview in 1971, McPhatter told journalist Marcia Vance, "whenever I'd get back on the block where everybody'd heard my records—half the time I couldn't afford a Coca-Cola."

Due to such occurrences, and as he was frequently at odds with Ward, McPhatter decided he would quit the Dominoes, intent on making a name for himself. He announced his intention to quit the group, and Ward agreed to his leaving provided that McPhatter stayed long enough to coach a replacement. Auditions for a replacement were later held at Detroit's Fox Theater, and a young Jackie Wilson eventually took over as lead tenor for the Dominoes. The position influenced Wilson's singing style and stage presence. "I fell in love with the man's voice. I toured with the group and watched Clyde and listened..."— and apparently learned.

Privately, McPhatter and Ward often argued, but publicly McPhatter expressed his appreciation of Ward for giving him his start in entertainment. "I think Billy Ward is a very wonderful musician and entertainer. I appreciate all he did for me in giving me my start in show business."

The Drifters (1953–54)
Ahmet Ertegun, founder of Atlantic Records, and Jerry Wexler, eagerly sought McPhatter after noticing he was not present for an appearance by the Dominoes at Birdland, which was "an odd booking for the Dominoes", in Ertegun's words.

After locating him, McPhatter was signed to Atlantic on the condition that he form his own group. McPhatter promptly assembled a group and called them the Drifters. They recorded a few tracks in June 1953, including a song called "Lucille", written by McPhatter himself. This group of Drifters did not have the sound Atlantic executives were looking for, however, and Clyde was prompted to assemble another group of singers. The initial members of the Drifters McPhatter assembled were mostly members of the Mount Lebanon Singers.

The revised lineup recorded and released such hits as "Money Honey", "Such a Night", "Honey Love", "White Christmas", and "Whatcha Gonna Do", with the record label displaying the group name "Clyde McPhatter and the Drifters" on the first two singles, later changed to "The Drifters featuring Clyde McPhatter".

In late 1954, McPhatter was inducted into the U.S. Army and assigned to Special Services in the continental United States, which allowed him to continue recording. After his tour of duty, he left the Drifters and launched a solo career.  The Drifters continued as a successful group, but with many changes in personnel, and the group assembled by McPhatter was long gone by the time their greatest successes were released after he left the group.

Upon his departure from the Drifters, McPhatter sold his share of the group to the band's manager George Treadwell, a decision that he later came to regret, after realizing that he caused his fellow musicians to experience unprofitability and the group essentially became a revolving-door line-up with recycled members on a ridiculous $100 weekly salary and paid virtually no royalties.

Solo career
Just after his military discharge, McPhatter recorded his first solo hit, "Love Has Joined Us Together", with Ruth Brown. He released several R&B recordings in the next few years, including "Rock and Cry", "Seven Days" (later a bigger hit for Tom Jones), "Treasure of Love", "Let Me Know", "Just to Hold My Hand", and his biggest solo hit, "A Lover's Question", written by Brook Benton and Jimmy T. Williams, which peaked at number six in 1958.

McPhatter's 1956 recording "Treasure of Love" was his first number-one hit on the R&B charts as a solo artist, and spent one week in the UK Singles Chart. It reached number 16 on the U.S. pop charts, sold over two million copies in the United States alone, and was awarded a gold disc by the Recording Industry Association of America.

After leaving Atlantic Records, McPhatter signed with MGM Records and released several more songs, including "I Told Myself a Lie" and "Think Me a Kiss" (1960), and his first single for Mercury Records, "Ta Ta". His tenure on these labels proved to be less fruitful than his time with Atlantic. He moved to other record labels and recorded more singles, including "I Never Knew" and his final top-10 hit, "Lover Please", written by country artist Billy Swan, which made it to number seven in 1962. After "Lover Please", McPhatter's career took a downward turn, as musical styles and tastes were constantly changing during the 1960s. He managed a top 30 R&B hit, "Crying Won't Help You Now", in 1964, then fell off the charts. McPhatter turned to alcohol abuse, sporadically releasing recordings that failed to chart.

In 1968, McPhatter moved to England, where he still had something of a following, using the UK band ICE as backup.

Death
McPhatter returned to the U.S. in 1970, making a few appearances in rock-and-roll revival tours, but lived mostly as a recluse. Hopes for a major comeback with a Decca album were crushed on June 13, 1972, when he died in his sleep at the age of 39, of complications of heart, liver, and kidney disease, brought on by alcohol abuse – behavior fueled by a failed career and resentment he harbored towards the fans he felt deserted him. In his interview with journalist Marcia Vance, McPhatter said, "I have no fans." He died at 1165 East 229th Street, in the Bronx, New York, where he had been living with Bertha M. Reid. They were traveling together as he tried to make a comeback.

McPhatter was a resident of Teaneck, New Jersey, at the time of his death. He was buried at George Washington Memorial Park in Paramus, New Jersey. At the time of his death, Clyde McPhatter had one daughter, Deborah L. McPhatter, born in April 1953.

Ruth Brown acknowledged in her later years that McPhatter was the father of her son Ronald, born in 1954. Ron now tours with his own group named after his father – Clyde McPhatter's Drifters.

Legacy and honors
In 1987, McPhatter was posthumously inducted into the Rock and Roll Hall of Fame.
 The Rockabilly Hall of Fame recognized his pioneering efforts.
 The Original Drifters were inducted into the Vocal Group Hall of Fame in 1998.
 The United States Postal Service issued a stamp in McPhatter's honor in 1993.
 The song "Money Honey" (1953) was inducted into the Grammy Hall of Fame in 1999.
 McPhatter was inducted into the North Carolina Music Hall of Fame in 2009.
 In October 2020, Clyde McPhatter's exhibit opened in the North Carolina Museum of History, named "The Beach Music Exhibit". This exhibit was completed with interviews and memorabilia supplied by his daughter Deborah, board chair of the North Carolina Music Hall of Fame.

Singles

Billboard Year-End performances

References

1930s births
1972 deaths
The Drifters members
African-American rock singers
Alcohol-related deaths in New York City
American expatriates in the United Kingdom
American male pop singers
American rhythm and blues singers
American rock singers
American soul singers
American tenors
Deaths from liver disease
Deaths from kidney disease
Musicians from Durham, North Carolina
People from Teaneck, New Jersey
Mercury Records artists
Atlantic Records artists
MGM Records artists
20th-century American singers
Year of birth uncertain
Burials at George Washington Memorial Park (Paramus, New Jersey)
Rock and roll musicians
20th-century American male singers